To the Next Level is the debut studio album by English R&B pop group MN8, released in May 1995 by Columbia Records. The album includes the single, "I've Got a Little Something for You".

Singles
"I've Got a Little Something for You" was released as the band's debut single in January 1995. It peaked at number 2 on the UK Singles Chart, giving them their first top 10 single. A second single from the album, "If You Only Let Me In", was released in April 1995. This debuted, and peaked, at number 6. The third single, "Happy", was released in July 1995. It debuted, and peaked, at number 8. "Baby It's You" was released in October 1995 and peaked at number 22, with "Pathway to the Moon" as the final single released in February 1996 peaking at number 25.

Track listing

Weekly charts

Certifications

References

1995 debut albums
MN8 albums
Columbia Records albums